Engine House No. 34 is a historic fire station at 444 Western Avenue near the corner of Waverly Street in the Brighton neighborhood of Boston, Massachusetts.  The station, a -story brick and brownstone structure, was designed by Charles Bateman and built in 1888.  It is one of a small number of Richardson Romanesque structures in the neighborhood, and features an engine entrance recessed behind a large round arch set asymmetrically on the main facade.  The roof is gabled, although it has a hipped section above, with a large hipped projection to the left.

The building was listed on the National Register of Historic Places in 1985.

See also
National Register of Historic Places listings in northern Boston, Massachusetts

References

Fire stations completed in 1887
Fire stations on the National Register of Historic Places in Massachusetts
Buildings and structures in Boston
National Register of Historic Places in Boston
Defunct fire stations in Massachusetts